Amido black 10B is an amino acid staining azo dye used in biochemical research to stain for total protein on transferred membrane blots, such as the western blot.  It is also used in criminal investigations to detect blood present with latent fingerprints. It stains the proteins in blood a blue-black color.  Amido Black can be either methanol or water based as it readily dissolves in both. With picric acid, in a van Gieson procedure, it can be used to stain collagen and reticulin.

See also
Western blot normalization

References

External links
MSDS at Oxford University

Azo dyes
Naphthalenesulfonates
Organic sodium salts
1-Naphthols
Nitrobenzenes
Aromatic amines
Acid dyes